"Bling Bling" is a song by New Orleans rapper B.G., released as the second single from his fifth studio album Chopper City in the Ghetto. It features Hot Boys and Big Tymers. The single peaked at number 36 on the Billboard Hot 100, making it B.G.'s most successful single to date. It is also featured on the soundtrack for the 2017 movie Girls Trip.

Critical reception
In 2013, Complex added the song in its list of nineteen great songs made by teenage rappers in the last 19 years. Complex editor Kyle Kramer said "Featuring carefree money boasts over a spry Mannie Fresh beat, the song still sounds relevant today in the Young Money era, proving the staying power of both diamonds and youth."

Charts

References

1999 singles
1999 songs
B.G. (rapper) songs
Big Tymers songs
Cash Money Records singles
Hot Boys songs
Lil Wayne songs
Song recordings produced by Mannie Fresh
Songs written by Juvenile (rapper)
Songs written by Lil Wayne
Songs written by Mannie Fresh
Universal Music Group singles
Posse cuts
Songs written by Birdman (rapper)